The Urengoy (former MPK-192) is a  in the Soviet Navy and later Russian Navy.

Specifications 

Developed in the GDR by specialists from the Zelenodolsk shipyard, Captain 2nd Rank O.K. Korobkov was appointed the main observer from the Navy on the project. For the GDR Navy, 16 ships were built (in Germany, Project 133.1, Parchim), the head MPK entered service in 1981. In 1992, all ships of the Project 133.1 were sold to Indonesia. For the USSR Navy, they were built according to the 1331M Project, after the collapse of the USSR, all ships were transferred to the Russian Navy. The modernized version was distinguished by updated artillery, hydroacoustic and radio-technical weapons.

Project 133.1 was developed on the basis of the IPC Project 1124 Albatross in the German Democratic Republic (GDR) with the help of specialists from the Zelenodolsk shipyard for the Navy of the National People's Army of the GDR and the Warsaw Pact countries, as well as for export sales.

Project 1331M was designed in the German Democratic Republic with the technical assistance of the Zelenodolsk Design Bureau for the USSR Navy, this project is a development of Project 133.1 and differs from it in the composition of weapons and navigation equipment.

Construction and career 
MPK-192 was laid down on 25 February 1985 at Peene-Werft, Wolgast. Launched on 29 August 1985 and commissioned on 19 December 1986 into the Baltic Fleet.

In 2005, the patronage of the ship was established by the Russian Party of Life.

On 28 May 2009, while trying to shoot down an aerial target during an exercise, the ship shot down the Green Grove coastal gardening area near Vyborg near St. Petersburg. (A. Pokrovsky). Gardening suffered minor property losses. According to media reports, compensation for gardeners in the amount of 25-30 tr. provided by the crew.

On 26 May 2011, he received the name Urengoy at the request of the Administration of the Purovsky region of the Yamal-Nenets Autonomous Okrug within the established patronage relations between the administration of the Purovsky region and military unit No. 22830 of the Leningrad naval base.

At the end of June 2016, he took part in an exercise in the Gulf of Finland.

In July 2017, the ship was attracted to participate in the naval parade on the occasion of the celebration of the Day of the Navy in St. Petersburg.

In 2018, the ship was attracted to participate in the Main Naval Parade on the occasion of the Day of the Navy.

On 28 July 2019, the ship took part in the Main Naval Parade to mark the Day of the Russian Navy.

Pennant numbers

Citations 

Ships built in East Germany
1986 ships
Parchim-class corvettes
Maritime incidents in 2009